Petrus Morinus or Pierre Morin (1531–1608) was a French biblical scholar.

Born in Paris, he moved to Italy, where he worked for a time for Paulus Manutius in Venice. He then taught Greek in Vicenza and Ferrara. By 1575 he was in Rome, working on editions of the Bible in the Vatican. He was an editor of the Septuagint and the Vulgate. 

Morinus died in Rome in 1608.

Notes

French biblical scholars
1531 births
1608 deaths